Anne Hankford (c. 1431 – 13 November 1485) was the first wife of Thomas Butler, 7th Earl of Ormond (c. 1426- 3 August 1515). She was the great-grandmother of Anne Boleyn.

She was a daughter and co-heiress of Sir Richard Hankford (c. 1397 – 1431) of Annery, Monkleigh, Devon, feudal baron of Bampton (grandson of Sir William Hankford (c. 1350 – 1423), Chief Justice of the King's Bench) by his second wife Lady Anne Montagu (d.1457), a daughter of John Montagu, 3rd Earl of Salisbury (c. 1350 – 1400). Her paternal grandparents were Richard Hankford and Thomasine de Stapeldon. Her maternal grandparents were John Montagu and Maud Francis, daughter of Sir Adam Francis, Lord Mayor of London.

She married Thomas Butler, 7th Earl of Ormond before 1450. He was the youngest son of James Butler, 4th Earl of Ormond and Joan de Beauchamp. They had two daughters:
Lady Margaret Butler (c.1454 – 1539) married Sir William Boleyn, by whom she had issue, including Thomas Boleyn, 1st Earl of Wiltshire, the father of Anne Boleyn, Mary Boleyn, and George Boleyn, by his wife Lady Elizabeth Howard
Lady Anne Butler (born c. 1455) who married Sir James St. Leger.
Theobold Butler (1477–1560)

Anne died on 13 November 1485, in the same month of the restoration of the estates and title of Ormonde to her husband by King Henry VII's first Parliament. Thomas Butler and his brothers had been declared traitors by King Edward IV, who had had statutes made against them at Westminster. After her death, Thomas Butler married Lora Berkeley, daughter of Sir Edward Berkeley, by whom he had a daughter who died young. In 1509, he was appointed Queen Catherine of Aragon's first Lord Chamberlain.

Notes

References 
 thepeerage.com Accessed December 18, 2007
 Bruce, Marie Louise Anne Boleyn. New York: Coward, McCann & Geoghegan, 1972

1431 births
1485 deaths
Ormond